John Collett (1798 – 28 November 1856) was an Irish Whig politician.

Collett was a member of the Reform Club, Union Club, Portland Club and Graham's Club.

References

External links
 

UK MPs 1841–1847
Whig (British political party) MPs for Irish constituencies
1798 births
1856 deaths